Colette Carr is an American singer, rapper and songwriter. Her discography consists of one studio album, five extended plays, one mixtape and eleven singles as a solo artist, as well as four singles as a featured artist. A music video for her song was released in 2009 called "Back It Up", which became a viral hit and was placed at number one on the MTV Music Chart.

Carr's debut album, Skitszo, was released July 9, 2013. "(We Do It) Primo", the lead single from Skitszo was released May 11, 2011. The fifth single from the album, "Never Gonna Happen" charted in Billboards US Dance/Club songs at number eleven.

Albums

Studio albums

Extended plays

Mixtapes

Singles

As main artist

As featured artist

Guest Appearances

Music videos

References 

Carr, Colette